Abraxas invasata is a species of moth belonging to the family Geometridae. It was described by William Warren in 1897. It is known from Borneo.

The habitat consists of lower and upper montane regions. The species mostly flies by day but may also come to light at night.

References

Abraxini
Moths of Asia
Moths described in 1897